Angelfire is a collaboration album by guitarist/composer singer Steve Morse and singer/songwriter Sarah Spencer, collectively known as the group (by the same name), Angelfire. It was released on August 10, 2010 by Radiant Records.

Track listing

Personnel
 Sarah Spencer – vocals
 Steve Morse – acoustic guitar, electric guitar, synthesizer, keyboard
 Dave LaRue – bass guitar
 Van Romaine – drums, percussion

Production
Steve Morse – production
Bill Evans – mastering engineering
Steve Morse – audio engineering

References

External links
Official website

2010 debut albums
Folk rock albums by American artists